The Women's Heptathlon competition at the 1983 World Championships in Athletics in Helsinki, Finland started on Monday 8 August 1983 and ended on Tuesday 9 August 1983. There were a total number of 26 participating athletes, including six non-finishers.

Medalists

Schedule

Monday, August 8, 1983 

Tuesday, August 9, 1983

Records

Results

See also
 1980 Women's Olympic Heptathlon (Moscow)
 1982 Women's European Championships Heptathlon (Athens)
 1984 Women's Olympic Heptathlon (Los Angeles)
 1986 Women's European Championships Heptathlon (Stuttgart)
 1987 Women's World Championships Heptathlon (Rome)
 1988 Women's Olympic Heptathlon (Seoul)

References
 Results
 IAAF Statistics Handbook Daegu 2011, Part 3 of 5, Page 263

H
Heptathlon at the World Athletics Championships
1983 in women's athletics